Buzz Lightyear of Star Command is an American animated science fiction action-adventure comedy television series produced by Walt Disney Television Animation and co-produced by Pixar Animation Studios. It serves as a spin-off of the Toy Story franchise and presents a fictionalized account of the in-universe character Buzz Lightyear. The series was preceded by the direct-to-video film Buzz Lightyear of Star Command: The Adventure Begins. and aired on UPN and ABC from October 2, 2000, to January 13, 2001, as part of Disney's One Saturday Morning and Disney's One Too programming blocks. While the series is 2D animated, Pixar animated the CGI opening title sequence at the beginning of each episode.

Developed by Bob Schooley and Mark McCorkle, who would later create Kim Possible for Disney Channel, the series follows the adventures of Space Ranger Buzz Lightyear. The character first appeared as an action figure in the 1995  American computer-animated comedy film Toy Story, which features original voice actor Tim Allen in the role; Allen's friend Patrick Warburton voices the character in the television series. A video game of the same name based on the series was released in 2000. An unrelated CGI-animated feature film fully produced by Pixar, Lightyear, was released in 2022, serving as an origin story for the character, voiced by Chris Evans.

This was the last Toy Story production for nearly a decade until the release of Toy Story 3 in 2010.

Story
Buzz Lightyear of Star Command is set in the far future. Capital Planet is the forefront of the Galactic Alliance, a peaceful union of various planets, home to various alien species that coexist in harmony. Star Command is a peacekeeping organization consisting of Space Rangers, who investigate threats to galactic peace. The primary enemy of Star Command, as well as Buzz’s archenemy is the Evil Emperor Zurg, an intergalactic crime boss and warlord that rules Planet Z, with an empire of heavily armed robots and slave races forced to work in opposition to the Galactic Alliance.

The series features Buzz Lightyear, a famous and experienced Space Ranger who takes a crew of rookies under his wing as he investigates criminal activity across the galaxy and attempts to bring down Zurg’s evil plots to rule the universe.

Characters

Star Command

Team Lightyear
 Captain Buzz Lightyear (voiced by Patrick Warburton): Famed Space Ranger known for heroism and bravery and leader of Team Lightyear. Buzz often suggests that his  archenemy Emperor Zurg is behind every evil plot and is often proven correct. Like his Toy Story incarnation, Buzz is a stickler for procedure, but will tell a cover story if he needs to. However, he has few people skills, and at times displays a lack of integrity. He attended PS- 193 (that's 6859) as a primary school. He wrote at least half of the regulations in the Star Command Manual. He also owns a house on Capital Planet, though as they all look alike and his duties often keep him away, he is confused over just which one is his. To compare this animation and the Toy Story films, the button between the red and blue ones is green in the Toy Story films and yellow in this animation with the releasing of strings when pressed. He seems to have a little crush on Dr. Ozma Furbanna and vice versa.
 Princess Mira Nova (voiced by Nicole Sullivan): A rookie ranger and heir to the Tangean throne. She utilizes her people's ability to phase through walls (called "ghosting") and read minds. Buzz has a tendency to refer to her as "Princess" when he's angry with her. She acts as Buzz's co-pilot and second-in-command. She has the most common sense of the team. Mira also has an estranged relationship with her father, King Nova, who disapproves of her choice of being a Space Ranger, though deep down she still cares about him. She has red hair and turquoise skin.
 Booster Sinclair Munchapper (voiced by Stephen Furst): A huge frog-like former janitor from the agricultural planet of Jo-ad (a play on the name of the Joad family, from John Steinbeck's The Grapes of Wrath). He has a big appetite and incredible strength, but is sweet and occasionally naive. He is in awe of Buzz Lightyear and has encyclopedic knowledge of his prior adventures.
 XR (voiced alternatively by Larry Miller and Neil Flynn): A short robot that was originally emotionless and programmed to learn from Buzz, but was blown apart by Agent Z during his first mission. The LGMs rebuilt him, but the temporary loss of the Uni-Mind to Emperor Zurg left them off their game. They rebuilt XR with his slicker, more emotional personality and a variety of attachments. XR stands for Experimental Ranger. (The LGMs have stated that this is the official meaning of the name, though other characters on the show hold the erroneous belief that the X stands for Expendable.) He gets blown apart on nearly every mission he goes on, but is easily rebuilt. He considers Commander Nebula his father (due to him unintentionally signing the paperwork authorizing his creation) and is always seeking his approval.

Other personnel
 Commander Nebula (voiced by Adam Carolla): The Space Rangers' commander and Buzz's superior, whose left leg was replaced by a pegleg-like plasma cannon. Rather short-tempered and constantly speaks with a loud voice. He has a robotic desk that forces him to do his paperwork. He hates to do so, though, and therefore signs forms without looking at them. By doing so, he inadvertently authorized the creation of XR, which was included on a vacation request form filled by the LGMs.
 LGMs, or Little Green Men (voiced by Patrick Warburton): The LGMs are small, three-eyed aliens (originally appeared as squeeze toy aliens in the Toy Story movies). They are the intensely loyal backbone of Star Command, keeping the station running while inventing/maintaining all of the equipment. When one of their own is kidnapped, the other LGMs will instinctively try to rescue him by any means necessary. LGMs are typically in awe of Buzz. While they generally like the other Rangers, they may not be able to tell one from another. Several of their race are also shown to work for Santa Claus, acting as his toy builders.
 Ty Parsec (voiced by Steve Hytner): Ty is the infamous old comrade of Buzz Lightyear, who is fed up with Buzz always coming to his rescue. The Space Ranger was accidentally transformed into the robotic Wirewolf (equivalent of a werewolf) on the planet of Canis Lunis, after being bitten by the villain NOS-4-A2 while exposed to radioactive moonrock. Appeared in two episodes, with a cameo appearance in the episode "War, Peace, and War". He is ultimately cured and reinstated as a Space Ranger.
 Rocket Crocket (voiced by Phil LaMarr): Member of Star Command and leader of Team Rocket. He has been Buzz's rival since their academy days.
 Fop Doppler (voiced by Rob Paulsen): A Tangean like Mira, he joined as a challenge to win her hand in marriage, but it was called off after he expressed his enjoyment of being a ranger right after helping foil Lord Angstrom's attempt to overthrow King Nova.
 Petra Hammerhold (voiced by Nikki Cox): Senator Hammerhold's daughter. She joined Star Command when her father forced her to do so (largely to keep her from her boyfriend Plasma Boy). She was initially resentful of this, but was moved by Buzz's heroism during a crisis.
 Plasma Boy (voiced by Michael Showalter): Petra's boyfriend, who has a Plasma Monster form. Booster competed against him for Petra's affection. When Mira and XR fired a laser at his Plasma Monster form, he destabilized enough to the brink of explosion. He was prevented from explosion when Booster used his suit and Ion Stabilization Matrix on him. He's now a member of Star Command.
 42 (voiced by Joy Behar): Usually the name of Buzz Lightyear's ship, it gained A.I. from one of the encounters with the Valkyran Raiders and a new energy projector device inserted on the ship by the LGMs. 42 doesn't like what Buzz says about her and usually controls the ship herself. XR developed a crush on her. When the Valkyran Raiders were thwarted, 42's consciousness was placed into a robot body and she now helps the LGMs.

Villains
 Evil Emperor Zurg (voiced by Wayne Knight): Main antagonist of the series and Buzz’s archenemy. Rules an empire on Planet Z, and wants to rule the entire universe while destroying Star Command. Zurg often takes any opportunity to eliminate Buzz. Most of his subjects are robots. His feet double as rockets and he can transform his arms into a variety of weapons. Despite often breaking the seriousness of otherwise purely evil statements, Zurg is widely considered the most evil person in the galaxy, especially by the other villains. He seems to have some neuroses about being touched. In some episodes is shown being sinister. The episode War, and Peace and War was notably the only episode where Zurg teamed up with Buzz Lightyear to defeat the Heed, a common enemy that was trying to take over their galaxy. In Stranger Invasion, he claimed to be Buzz's father (a parody upon The Empire Strikes Back and a nearly identical scene in Toy Story 2), but quickly took it back, using the statement as a 'Made You Look' in order to stun and deceive Buzz and gain the upper hand.
 Grubs (voiced by Frank Welker): Zurg's equivalents to the LGMs of Star Command (though far less competent). They perform mechanical and technical duties. The Grubs work for Zurg against their will and also desire freedom, but many of them are simply too afraid to try to defect.
 Brain Pods (Various Voices for each one): Cybernetic brains in mobile jars, who serve Zurg as scientists and researchers. Although they take pride in their creations, they secretly harbor a desire to escape from Zurg's control. (Two of which are shown succeeding in doing so on-screen.)
 Hornets: The Hornets are Zurg's robotic foot soldiers, extremely expendable, lousy shots and always get vaporized in mass numbers by Lightyear's team. Hornets come in different models, but the most frequently seen are yellow and of average height.
 Warp Darkmatter (voiced by Diedrich Bader) was once Buzz's partner and best friend, but he had been secretly working for Zurg since his academy days as a double agent and also betrayed Star Command. He eventually began working for him full-time as "Agent Z." His right arm is robotic (with various weapon attachments) and was grafted to his body after becoming Agent Z. Warp often takes on assignments for Zurg and is paid quite handsomely. (He owns a moon and a summer home.) Though Buzz has vowed to bring him in for treason, he retains some hope that there is still some good in him.
 Evil Buzz Lightyear (voiced by Patrick Warburton) is the evil counterpart of Buzz from an alternate universe where he is an evil emperor instead of Zurg due to the fact that Zurg in the alternate universe apparently didn’t have what it took to be the ultimate evil (Zurg now works as a server at Cosmo’s Diner) and has destroyed Star Command along with various other planets and the Galactic Alliance. The Evil Buzz looks exactly like Buzz Lightyear, except having facial hair and wearing armour similar to Emperor Zurg, but with pants and without a cape, and the letter L in the center of his chest instead of the letter Z. He appears to be more dangerous and evil than Emperor Zurg but despite being intimidated, Emperor Zurg teams up with the Evil Buzz to eliminate Buzz Lightyear and Star Command in the original universe but was thwarted by Buzz with the help of the alternate counterparts of Booster, Mira, XR and Nebula. Evil Buzz escapes and later teams up and falls in love with Gravitina.
 Gravitina (voiced by Kerri Kenney-Silver): A large-headed female villain with mental control over gravity. One of Zurg's allies and once hired to destroy Star Command. She's in love with Buzz and later his evil counterpart.
  (voiced by Craig Ferguson): NOS-4-A2 is a robotic vampire created by Zurg. He is capable of draining any system or entity driven by electrical power, as well as controlling any machine he bites. His bite (in combination with radioactive moonrock) also transformed Ty Parsec into Wirewolf. Using Wirewolf and XL, he briefly usurped control of Planet Z from Zurg and attempted to transform everyone in the galaxy into robots for him to feed on, but was defeated and destroyed by Buzz, XR, Wirewolf and a reformed XL. His name is a pun on the term Nosferatu.
 Torque (voiced by Brad Garrett): Minor alien villain who committed crimes of terrorism, smuggling, arson, and unpaid parking tickets. After being freed from a prison transport by Zurg's Hornets, the Grubs implanted a cell-separation device upon his chest. Torque then possesses the ability to create duplicate versions of himself. They are unstable, however, as a single laser blast is enough to destroy them. In "The Taking of PC-7", he tried to turn Booster evil (and later Buzz) with a memory-altering device built by the Warden of PC-7. The same device also made Torque (temporarily at least) a heroic good guy. Torque rides a motorcycle-shaped spacecraft and his duplication abilities seem to be a reference to the character Lobo (who was also voiced by Brad Garrett in his DCAU appearances).
 XL (voiced by Bobcat Goldthwait): XR's predecessor (and technically older brother), who was shut down due to his villainous attitude. When he was reactivated by Zurg, XL rebuilt himself into a larger, more powerful robot with cutting edge (and stolen) robot parts. His head is red, whereas XR's is yellow. He infiltrates Star Command numerous times because its command codes are in his head. Like XR, he considers Commander Nebula his father, though he resents him for shutting him down. He later redeems himself and is converted into an office managing robot capable of photocopying, collating, and other office related functions, but is never seen for the rest of the series afterwards. His name is a pun referring to his size (extra large).
 Wirewolf (voiced by Steve Hytner): A Space Ranger (Ty Parsec; see above) who patrolled the planet Canis Lunis until an attack from NOS-4-A2. While Ty was in combat with the energy vampire, NOS-4-A2, flew himself and Ty up into the beam, which gave power to the planet from the moon's radioactive energy, and bit into Ty's skin. After NOS-4-A2 fled, Ty started to mutate into some sort of electronic canine, later given the title of "Wirewolf." Having discovered that this transformation only happens in the light of the Canis Lunis moon, Buzz told Booster to destroy the moon. Once the moon was destroyed, Team Lightyear believed that the Wirewolf was finished until NOS-4-A2 gave Ty a Canis Lunis moonrock. When NOS-4-A2 was destroyed, Ty was turned back to normal, ending the curse of the Wirewolf.

Galactic Alliance
 Madam President (voiced by Roz Ryan): Head of the Galactic Alliance. Her real name is unknown.
 Senator Aarrfvox (voiced by Jim Cummings): A Shragorakian senator.
 Senator Banda (voiced by Dan Castellaneta): A Bathyosian senator.
 Senator Hammerhold (voiced by Corey Burton): Petra Hammerhold's father.
 Senator Phlegmex (voiced by Frank Welker): A slime-emitting senator.

Other characters
 Becky (voiced by Russi Taylor): A little alien girl from the planet Roswell. She befriended Booster (whom she calls Pickles) when Team Lightyear's ship crashed on her planet.
 Brent Starkisser (voiced by Corey Burton): The Galaxy's reporter.
 Cosmo (voiced by Paul Rugg): An alien that owns and runs the diner that Team Lightyear eats at. He has a mechanical arm as well as a foreign accent.
 Dr. Animus (voiced by Tony Jay): The Galaxy's therapist.
 Dr. Ozma Furbanna (voiced by Linda Hamilton): Lead (and only) naturalist on planet Karn. She favors all animals (even the lethal carnivores) and hates to have them hurt, no matter what. Has a crush on Buzz (won't admit it, though), and vice versa. Zurg once used her help to hatch the Millennial Bugs (entirely ticklish) where Zurg used them on Capital Planet.
 Ed (voiced by Paul Rugg): A courier who somehow always knows how to track down Buzz Lightyear.
 Officer Panchex (voiced by Brian Doyle-Murray): A fish policeman who helped Buzz Lightyear fight Minister Gularis.
 Professor Triffid (voiced by Joel Murray): A scientist from Rhizome. He cares a lot for the plants there.
 Savy SL2 (voiced by Cree Summer): Her adopted robot parents were attacked by NOS-4-A2 in The Slayer, which lead her to hunting him down for revenge.
 Sheriff of Roswell (voiced by Stephen Root): Becky's father and ally of Team Lightyear.
 King Nova (voiced by John O'Hurley): Mira's father and the ruler of Tangea. Being more tradition bound he clearly disapproves of his daughter being a Space Ranger and therefore has a complicated relationship with her as well as Buzz. But regardless of his pompous nature he still cares about his daughter and also came to her aid when she had developed a power addiction and helped her get over it, though he almost got his wish of getting his daughter back in this instance had Buzz not saved her career through a cover story.
 Santa Claus (voiced by Earl Boen): The holiday figure, who delivers presents to all the good people in the galaxy during the Holiday. He previously used a sleigh powered by belief and later time manipulation to accomplish this massive task. Zurg stole his time manipulation device to destroy the Holiday for everyone, prompting Santa to seek Team Lightyear's help.
 The Fixer (voiced by Ed Asner): A character from Trade World. He sells robotic parts to people around Trade World, and once tricked XR into delivering a package to XL.
 Crumford Lorak (voiced by Jon Favreau): A conman, informant and criminal commonly seen on Trade World. When this guy gets the chance, he always tricks or turns on the first ranger he sees.
 Rentwhistle Swack (voiced by French Stewart): An unscrupulous conman who will do anything for money.

Episodes
Production codes were taken from the Library of Congress.

Broadcast and syndication
The series was aired during UPN's Disney's One Too programming block from October 2000 to August 2003. One episode, "Super Nova", only aired twice during its original run. It also aired on Disney Channel from June 5, 2006, to May 16, 2008, when it was taken off the air in the U.S.. Two episodes, "Conspiracy" and "Inside Job", were rarely seen after 2001. The show also aired on Toon Disney from 2003 to 2007 as well as on the network's Jetix block for a brief time in 2004.

Production
Developed by Bob Schooley and Mark McCorkle, later the creators of Kim Possible and Big Hero 6: The Series, the series was originally announced when plans for a Toy Story television series were announced (including a Woody's Roundup series, which was ultimately cancelled). 62 episodes of Buzz Lightyear of Star Command were made, but due to ending production in 1999-2000, the show's episode run was aired on UPN and ABC out of order, despite the show being a success during its airing.

Awards and nominations
Daytime Emmy Awards
2001 – Outstanding Sound Editing - Special Class – Jennifer Mertens, Paca Thomas, Otis Van Osten, Rick Hammel, Eric Hertsguaard, Robbi Smith, Brian F. Mars, Marc S. Perlman, and Dominick Certo (won)

Video game
A video game titled Buzz Lightyear of Star Command was developed by Traveller's Tales and published by Activision, and released for PlayStation, Game Boy Color, Microsoft Windows, and Dreamcast in 2000. The gameplay revolves around Buzz chasing down the various villains from the show, and defeating them using different color coded weapons.

Notes

References

External links

 
 

 
Toy Story
2000 American television series debuts
2001 American television series endings
2000s American animated television series
2000s American superhero comedy television series
2000s American comic science fiction television series
American Broadcasting Company original programming
American children's animated action television series
American children's animated space adventure television series
American children's animated comic science fiction television series
American children's animated science fantasy television series
American children's animated superhero television series
American animated television spin-offs
Buzz Lightyear
Disney's One Too
English-language television shows
Television series by Disney Television Animation
Television series based on Disney films
Television series by Pixar
Disney animated television series
Television series about outer space
Television series set on fictional planets
Television series created by Bob Schooley and Mark McCorkle
Animated television shows based on films
UPN original programming